Stefano Bargauan ( 1954 – June 2013) was an Italian figure skater. Competing in men's singles, he was the 1971 Prague Skate champion, 1970 Kennedy Memorial Winter Games bronze medalist, and Italian national champion. He also competed in ice dancing with Letizia Ghirardelli.

His siblings, Michele and Willy, also competed in figure skating. The family worked in television broadcasting.

Competitive highlights

References 

1950s births
2013 deaths
Italian male single skaters
Figure skaters from Milan